Gorewang Kgamane was the Bamangwato chief from 1925 up until he died in 1931. After his death, the chieftainship was regained by Khama family. Gorewang Kgamane's cousin, Sediegeng Kgamane, was given the Chair to act on the behalf of Seretse Khama's son Ian Khama.

See also
List of rulers of Bangwato (bamaNgwato)

Botswana chiefs
1931 deaths
Year of birth missing